D55 may refer to :

 roads in various countries:
 D55 road (Croatia), a state route in Croatia
 D55 motorway (Czech Republic), a motorway in the Czech Republic
 D55 road (Nord), a "départementale" road in Nord département in France
 HMAS Parramatta (D-55), a 1910 River class torpedo boat destroyer from the Australian Navy
 two ships of the Royal Navy :
 HMS Smiter (D55), a 1943 Bogue-class auxiliary aircraft carrier
 HMS Finisterre (D55), a Battle-class destroyer 
 INS Ranvijay (D55), a 1988 Rajput class destroyer from the Indian Navy
 CIE Standard Illuminant D55, a lighting standard used in colorimetry
and also:
 Robertson Field (North Dakota) FAA code
 the ICD-10 code for an anaemia due to enzyme disorders
 New South Wales D55 class locomotive, a NSWGR steam locomotive